Parides alopius, the white-dotted cattleheart, is an endemic Mexican butterfly in the family Papilionidae.  It has also strayed once into the United States in southeastern Arizona.

Description
The upperside of the wings is black with the hindwing having two rows of submarginal spots: the first row, white; and the second row, pink.  Males have fewer white spots than females.  The underside of the wings are similar except the hindwing pink spots are more conspicuous.  It has a wingspan of .A full description is provided by Rothschild, W. and Jordan, K. (1906)

Flight
This species has been seen on the wing from March to November.

Habitat
The white-dotted cattleheart may be encountered in pine-oak forests.

Life cycle
The larva is ringed with black and white bands and has yellow and reddish-brown fleshy projections.  Each side of the body contains red, orange and white spots.  The chrysalis is shaped very similar to that of the pipevine swallowtail (Battus philenor).  It is blue green with the head, parts of the thorax, and abdomen a bright yellow green.  It is unknown whether the chrysalis has a brown form or not.

Host plants
The only recorded host plant for the white-dotted cattleheart is Watson's pipevine (Aristolochia watsonii).

Status
It is uncommon and known from very few localities, but is not known to be threatened.

Etymology
The specific name comes from the classical tradition. Alopius was the son of Antiope the daughter of Thespius.

References

External links

Parides alopius, Butterflies of America

alopius
Butterflies of North America
Endemic Lepidoptera of Mexico
Taxa named by Frederick DuCane Godman
Taxa named by Osbert Salvin
Butterflies described in 1890
Fauna of the Sierra Madre Occidental
Fauna of the Sierra Madre del Sur